Do Pal is a 1991 Indian Hindi-language film directed by Ravi Rai for producer Rajesh Bhatia, starring Akshay Anand, Doly Sharma and Paresh Rawal.

Cast

Akshay Anand
Dolly Sharma
Paresh Rawal

Music
"Ab To Mera Sona Chandi" - Udit Narayan
"Ye Deep Jalta Rahe" - Mohammed Aziz, Sadhana Sargam
"Chori Ye Man Tadpe Sajan" - Lata Mangeshkar
"Pakadke Unglee" - Mohammed Aziz
"Pyar Me Yeh Duree Tadpaye" - Amit Kumar, Sadhana Sargam

Reception
Subhash K. Jha reviewed the film for The Indian Express.

References

External links
 

Films scored by Rajesh Roshan
1991 films
1990s Hindi-language films
Indian romantic drama films
1991 romantic drama films